Pablo Márquez is an Argentinean guitarist. Born in Argentina, he is known for his interpretations of historical classical works as well as his performances of Argentinean traditional music. He is also a professor at the Musik-Akademie of Basel.

Márquez started his guitar studies at the age of 10, and gave his first performance three years later with an orchestra in Salta, the city in the Northwest of Argentina where he grew up and received his first training. Márquez then studied in Buenos Aires with Jorge Martínez Zárate and Eduardo Fernández. He quickly earned notice for his work, winning unanimous first prizes at the Villa-Lobos and Radio France international competitions in Rio de Janeiro and Paris respectively, with later prizes at competitions in Geneva and Munich. As a musician, Márquez studied conducting with Eric Sobzyck, Rodolfo Fischer and Peter Eötvös, and followed the teaching of pianist György Sebők.

Over Márquez's career, he has performed at concert halls in more than 40 countries, including Concertgebouw in Amsterdam, Teatro Colón of Buenos Aires, Herkulessaal in Munich, and both the Théâtre du Châtelet and Opéra Comique in Paris, and continued to perform at international music festivals. He collaborated with Anja Lechner and Anne Gastinel, Patricia Kopatchinskaja, the Rosamunde Quartett of Munich, Dino Saluzzi and María Cristina Kiehr. He is regularly invited to perform as a soloist with orchestras and ensembles, including Bayerischer Rundfunk of Munich, Orchestre Philharmonique de Radio France, Philharmonie Baden-Baden, and Nouvel Ensemble Moderne de Montreal, under the baton of Josep Pons, Susanna Mälkki, Lorraine Vaillancourt, Fabián Panisello and others.

Márquez has had close collaborations with composers, including Luciano Berio, György Kurtág, and Mauricio Kagel. Pierre Boulez invited him to play Berio’s Sequenza XI for the 70th birthday celebrations of the Italian composer. Zad Moultaka, Félix Ibarrondo, Javier Torres Maldonado, Ahmed Essyad, and Oscar Strasnoy among others, have written pieces for Márquez.

Márquez's various recordings, released through the ECM New Series, Naïve Records and Kairos labels, have received such prizes as the Grand Prix du Disque of the Académie Charles Cros, the Italian Amadeus Prize and the RTL Classique d’Or.

Márquez received the Konex Prize for lifetime achievement, and in 2006 was announced as an Honorary Citizen of Salta, Argentina.

External links
 Official site 

Argentine classical guitarists
Argentine male guitarists
1967 births
Living people